Gaetani may refer to:

Inhabitants of the Italian city of Gaeta (Lazio)
Caetani, an Italian noble family
Filippo Gaetani (born 1964), American musician
Jan de Gaetani (1933–1989), American singer

See also
Benedetto Gaetani (disambiguation)
Caetani (surname)